Craugastor megacephalus is a species of frog in the family Craugastoridae.
It is found in Costa Rica, Honduras, Nicaragua, and Panama.
Its natural habitats are subtropical or tropical moist lowland forests, subtropical or tropical moist montane forests, and heavily degraded former forest.
It is threatened by habitat loss.

References

megacephalus
Amphibians described in 1875
Taxonomy articles created by Polbot